Lithophane  is a genus of moths of the family Noctuidae. They spend the winter as adults. Some species are capable of feeding on other caterpillars or on sawfly larvae, which is rather uncommon among Lepidoptera.

Species

 Lithophane abita Brou & Lafontaine, 2009
 Lithophane adipel Benjamin, 1936
 Lithophane alaina Boursin, 1957
 Lithophane amanda (Smith, 1900)
 Lithophane antennata (Walker, 1858)
 Lithophane atara (Smith, 1909)
 Lithophane baileyi Grote, 1877 (syn: Lithophane vivida (Dyar, 1910))
 Lithophane bethunei (Grote & Robinson, 1868)
 Lithophane boogeri J.T.Troubridge, 2006
 Lithophane brachyptera (Staudinger, 1892)
 Lithophane consocia – Scarce Conformist (Borkhausen, 1792)
 Lithophane contenta Grote, 1800
 Lithophane contra (Barnes & Benjamin, 1924)
 Lithophane dailekhi Hreblay & Ronkay, 1999
 Lithophane dilatocula (Smith, 1900)
 Lithophane disposita Morrison, 1874
 Lithophane fagina Morrison, 1874
 Lithophane franclemonti Metzler, 1998
 Lithophane furcifera – The Conformist (Hufnagel, 1766)
 Lithophane furiosa Hreblay & Ronkay, 1999
 Lithophane gansuana Kononenko, 2009
 Lithophane gausapata Grote, 1883
 Lithophane georgii Grote, 1875
 Lithophane glauca Hreblay & Ronkay, 1998
 Lithophane griseobrunnea Hreblay & Ronkay, 1999
 Lithophane grotei (Riley, 1882)
 Lithophane hemina Grote, 1879
 Lithophane holophaea Draudt, 1934
 Lithophane innominata – Nameless Pinion (Smith, 1893)
 Lithophane itata (Smith, 1899)
 Lithophane jeffreyi J.T. Troubridge & Lafontaine, 2003
 Lithophane joannis Covell & Metzler 1992
 Lithophane laceyi (Barnes & McDunnough, 1913)
 Lithophane lamda – The Nonconformist (Fabricius, 1787)
 Lithophane lanei J.T.Troubridge, 2006
 Lithophane lapidea (Hübner, [1808])
 Lithophane laticinerea Grote, 1874
 Lithophane laurentii Köhler, 1961
 Lithophane leautieri – Blair's Shoulder-Knot (Boisduval, 1829)
 Lithophane ledereri Staudinger, 1891
 Lithophane leeae Walsh, 2009
 Lithophane lemmeri – Lemmer's Pinion Barnes & Benjamin, 1929
 Lithophane lepida Grote, 1878
 Lithophane longior (Smith, 1899)
 Lithophane merckii (Rambur, 1832)
 Lithophane nagaii Sugi, 1958
 Lithophane nasar (Smith, 1909)
 Lithophane oriunda Grote, 1874
 Lithophane ornitopus – Grey Shoulder-Knot (Hufnagel, 1766)
 Lithophane pacifica Kononenko, 1978
 Lithophane patefacta (Walker, 1858)
 Lithophane pertorrida (McDunnough, 1942)
 Lithophane petulca Grote, 1874 (syn: Lithophane ferrealis Grote, 1874)
 Lithophane pexata Grote, 1874
 Lithophane plumbealis (Matsumura, 1926)
 Lithophane ponderosa J.T. Troubridge & Lafontaine, 2003
 Lithophane pruena (Dyar, 1910)
 Lithophane pruinosa (Butler, 1878)
 Lithophane puella (Smith, 1900)
 Lithophane querquera Grote, 1874 (syn: Lithophane nigrescens (Engel, 1905))
 Lithophane remota Hreblay & Ronkay, 1998
 Lithophane rosinae (Püngeler, 1906)
 Lithophane scottae J.T.Troubridge, 2006
 Lithophane semibrunnea – Tawny Pinion (Haworth, 1809)
 Lithophane semiusta Grote, 1874
 Lithophane signosa (Walker, 1857)
 Lithophane socia – Pale Pinion (Hufnagel, 1766)
 Lithophane subtilis Franclemont, 1969
 Lithophane tarda (Barnes & Benjamin, 1925)
 Lithophane tephrina Franclemont, 1969
 Lithophane tepida Grote, 1874
 Lithophane thaxteri Grote, 1874
 Lithophane thujae Webster & Thomas, 2000
 Lithophane torrida (Smith, 1899)
 Lithophane trimorpha Hreblay & Ronkay, 1997
 Lithophane unimoda (Lintner, 1878)
 Lithophane ustulata (Butler, 1878)
 Lithophane vanduzeei (Barnes, 1928)
 Lithophane venusta (Leech, 1889)
 Lithophane violascens Hreblay & Ronkay, 1999
 Lithophane viridipallens Grote, 1867

References

 Lithophane at funet.fi

 Natural History Museum Lepidoptera genus database

 
Taxa named by Jacob Hübner